The Hajiji cabinet took office on 29 September 2020, three days after the 2020 Sabah State Election.

The cabinet consists of ministers and assistant ministers from the Gabungan Rakyat Sabah (GRS), the dissidents of Barisan Nasional (BN) and Pakatan Harapan (PH). BN led by then Deputy Chief Minister and State Minister of Works Bung Moktar Radin withdrew in January 2023, causing a political crisis. However, there were a few dissidents who did not follow BN to withdraw support for Hajiji, among them are Tanjung Keramat MLA Shahelmey Yahya who was later promoted to Deputy Chief Minister and appointed as State Minister of Works. Following this, Sabah BN is split into two factions in the government led by Shahelmey and opposition led by Bung Moktar. The crisis also saw PH joining the government after it decided to support Hajiji and allow him to regain the majority support in the assembly to remain as Chief Minister.

Current arrangement, 2023–present

Ministers

Assistant Ministers

Former arrangement, 2020-2023

Ministers

Assistant Ministers

Ex-officio members

References 

Politics of Sabah
Cabinets established in 2020
Current governments
2020 establishments in Malaysia